Eslamabad (also Romanized as Eslāmābād) is a village in Qalat Rural District, Bidshahr district, Evaz County, Fars Province, Iran. At the 2006 census, its population was 597, in 119 families.

References 

Populated places in Evaz County